Imantodes gemmistratus, the Central American tree snake, is a snake species in the colubrid family, found from Mexico, through Central America and Colombia.

Distribution
Mexico, Guatemala, Honduras, El Salvador, Nicaragua, Costa Rica, Panama, Colombia, and possibly in Belize.

Subspecies 
The following subspecies are recognized: 
 Imantodes gemmistratus gemmistratus (Cope, 1861)
 Imantodes gemmistratus gracillimus (Günther, 1895)
 Imantodes gemmistratus latistratus (Cope, 1887)
 Imantodes gemmistratus luciodorsus Oliver, 1942
 Imantodes gemmistratus oliveri Smith, 1942
 Imantodes gemmistratus reticulatus (Müller, 1882)
 Imantodes gemmistratus splendidus (Günther, 1895)

References 

Imantodes
Snakes of North America
Snakes of Central America
Snakes of South America
Reptiles of Colombia
Reptiles of Costa Rica
Reptiles of El Salvador
Reptiles of Guatemala
Reptiles of Honduras
Reptiles of Mexico
Reptiles of Nicaragua
Reptiles of Panama
Reptiles described in 1861
Taxa named by Edward Drinker Cope